Song Shiji (born 18 October 1964) is a Chinese cross-country skier. She competed in three events at the 1984 Winter Olympics.

References

External links
 

1964 births
Living people
Chinese female cross-country skiers
Olympic cross-country skiers of China
Cross-country skiers at the 1984 Winter Olympics
Skiers from Jilin
Asian Games medalists in cross-country skiing
Cross-country skiers at the 1986 Asian Winter Games
Cross-country skiers at the 1990 Asian Winter Games
Medalists at the 1986 Asian Winter Games
Medalists at the 1990 Asian Winter Games
Asian Games gold medalists for China
Asian Games silver medalists for China
Asian Games bronze medalists for China